Outnumbered (sometimes stylized as Out#) is an American daytime news and talk show that airs weekdays on Fox News at 12 p.m. ET. Hosts Harris Faulkner, Emily Compagno, Kayleigh McEnany and a rotating female panelist with one male guest panelist, discuss the news and issues of the day.

Hosts

Current
 Harris Faulkner (2014–present) — an Emmy Award-winning journalist and author, host of The Faulkner Focus
 Emily Compagno (2021–present) — host of The FOX True Crime Podcast w/ Emily Compagno, lawyer and former Oakland Raiders head cheerleader
 Kayleigh McEnany (2021–present) — former White House press secretary for the Trump administration

Former
 Melissa Francis — (2018—2020) Abruptly pulled from the air following a pay dispute and was fired. Later replaced by Emily Compagno in early 2021.
 Meghan McCain — (2016—2017) Took a leave of absence following her father John McCain being diagnosed with brain cancer and later announced her departure from the network. McCain went on to co-host The View. Was replaced years later by Kayleigh McEnany.
 Sandra Smith — (2014—2018) An original panelist from the shows inception, departed the show to co-anchor America's Newsroom. Smith is now a co-anchor of America Reports. Replaced by Melissa Francis. 
 Andrea Tantaros — (2014—2016) Released from contract after filing a sexual harassment complaint and replaced with Meghan McCain

Rotating Panelist
The following Fox News/Fox Business personalities appear on a rotating basis in the fifth spot on the shows couch, and occasionally fill in for the main hosts.
Dagen McDowell — co-host of The Bottom Line on Fox Business 
Julie Banderas — Fox News anchor
Lisa Kennedy Montgomery — Host of Kennedy on Fox Business 
Carley Shimkus — Fox & Friends First co-host 
Nicole Saphier — Fox News medical contributor 
Lisa Boothe — Fox News contributor, host of The Truth w/Lisa Boothe on iHeart radio
Tomi Lahren — Fox News Contributor, host of Tomi Lahren is Fearless on OutKick
Kat Timpf — Gutfeld! co-host
Cheryl Casone — Fox Business anchor
Jessica Tarlov —  co-host of The Five 
Leslie Marshall — radio host, Fox News Contributor 
Rachel Campos-Duffy — Fox & Friends Weekend co-host
Martha MacCallum — host of The Story with Martha MacCallum
Tammy Bruce — Fox News contributor  
Michele Tafoya — Former NFL sideline reporter
Janette Nesheiwat — Fox News medical contributor
Kellyanne Conway — Fox News contributor, former Senior Advisor to President Donald Trump
Marie Harf — Fox News contributor, former deputy spokesperson for the United States Department of State
Amy Freeze — anchor of Weather Command on Fox Weather
Ainsley Earhardt — Fox & Friends co-host
Mollie Hemingway — Fox News Contributor, Senior Editor of The Federalist Magazine
Katrina Campins — host of Mansion Global on Fox Business
Gerri Willis — Fox Business Correspondent 
Kara Frederick — The Heritage Foundation research fellow

Programming changes 
On October 2, 2017, it was announced that Outnumbered would be moved to Studio M, and the show would have an extended hour titled Outnumbered, Overtime with Harris Faulkner.

On January 18, 2021, Outnumbered Overtime ended and was replaced by America Reports. Harris Faulkner currently hosts The Faulkner Focus, which airs before Outnumbered, at 11 a.m. ET.

Location 
Outnumbered  broadcasts from Studio M at 1211 Avenue of the Americas (also known as the News Corp. Building), in New York City, after moving from Studio D on October 2, 2017.

References

External links

2014 American television series debuts
2010s American television talk shows
2020s American television talk shows
2020s American television series
English-language television shows
Fox News original programming